Vice President of Rwanda (French: Vice-président rwandais, Kinyarwanda: visiperezida) was a political position in Rwanda created for Paul Kagame from July 1994 to April 2000. The office was abolished in 2000. 

The position also existed in Rwandan constitution from 1961 until 1973. However, the position was never fulfilled between 1961 to 1969.

List of Vice President of Rwanda

References 

Government of Rwanda
Rwanda
Titles held only by one person